Walter Webb Hall (WWH) is a building on the University of Texas at Austin campus, in the U.S. state of Texas. The building was completed in 1973, and has housed the campus club and faculty center.

The Texas Historical Association started renting space in the building in 2015.

References

1973 establishments in Texas
University and college buildings completed in 1973
University of Texas at Austin campus